Highway 61 is a 1991 Canadian film directed by Bruce McDonald. The film is an unofficial sequel to his 1989 film Roadkill; although focusing on different characters, it centres on a road trip beginning in Thunder Bay, Ontario, where the road trip depicted in the earlier film ended.

Plot
The film stars Don McKellar as Pokey Jones, an orphaned barber in a small town near Thunder Bay, who dreams of becoming a jazz musician. One morning, Jones discovers a frozen corpse (Steve Fall) in his backyard, and soon meets Jackie Bangs (Valerie Buhagiar), a tough and mysterious roadie who claims the dead man is her brother.

Jackie's real intention is to use the body, a vagrant unknown to anyone in town, to smuggle stolen drugs into the United States. She convinces Pokey to use his parents' car, which has not been driven in decades, to drive her to New Orleans to bury her brother. So Jackie and Pokey set out along Highway 61, coffin strapped to the top of the car, and follow Bob Dylan's famous U.S. Highway 61 south through the heart of the United States. They are pursued by Mr. Skin (Earl Pastko), who believes he is Satan and wants to claim the body because the dead man sold Mr. Skin his soul.

Peter Breck is fourth-billed as Mr. Watson, the "stage-mom" father of three girls: Mississippi (Missy), Minnesota (Minnie), and Louisiana (Louise). The film also includes cameo appearances by Tav Falco, Jello Biafra, and Art Bergmann.

The film's soundtrack album includes songs by Bourbon Tabernacle Choir, Rita Chiarelli, Nash the Slash, Acid Test, Jellyfishbabies, and Tom Jones. Nash the Slash also composed the film's instrumental score.

In 2001, Playback named Highway 61 the 15th best Canadian film since 1986. McDonald won "Best Director" honours at both San Sebastián International Film Festival and Brussels International Festival of Fantasy Film.

External links
 
 

1991 films
1991 comedy films
1990s comedy road movies
Canadian comedy road movies
1990s chase films
English-language Canadian films
Films about automobiles
Films directed by Bruce McDonald
Films set in Northern Ontario
1990s English-language films
1990s Canadian films